White Horse Hill National Game Preserve (Dakota: , formerly known as Sullys Hill National Game Preserve) is a National Wildlife Refuge and nature center located on the shore of Devils Lake in Benson County, North Dakota, within the Spirit Lake Tribe reservation.

History 
In 1904, Congress authorized a memorial park at the site, and President Theodore Roosevelt established it as Sullys Hill Park. Though not part of its official name, it would be called Sullys Hill National Park, the meaning of "national park" not yet standardized, as this site's small size and lack of a significant landmark was inconsistent with other national parks. It was first named after General Alfred Sully, son of the painter Thomas Sully who gained his reputation by carrying out several massacres of Dakota including at the Battle of Whitestone Hill.

On March 3, 1931, during the Great Depression, the United States Congress transferred the park to be managed by the Fish and Wildlife Service as a wildlife refuge, where hunting is permitted with the Spirit Lake Tribe having both fishing and hunting rights. It is one of only seven National Parks to have been disbanded. Of these seven parks, only White Horse Hill and Mackinac National Park in Michigan, now Mackinac Island State Park, are no longer under the control of the National Park Service.

In December 2019, the park was renamed through an act of Congress to its traditional Dakota name of White Horse Hill. In May 2019, the Spirit Lake Tribal council had requested the federal government change the name to White Horse Hill in cooperation with the governor's office and the North Dakota Department of Tourism stating, "The Spirit Lake Dakota people... believe the name chosen, White Horse Hill, comes from historical happenings that are sacred as well as unique to the Dakota people. White Horse Hill (Sunka Wakan Ska Pa Ha) reflects a positive experience to the Dakota People rather than an individual who was destructive to the Dakota people and their culture".

Recreation and natural resources
 The park's 1,674 acres (6.8 km²), a mixture of mixed grass prairie, marshes and wooded hills, includes wildlife as 20-30 American bison, 25-40 elk, 20-30 white-tailed deer, and a colony of prairie dogs. An array of birds, insects, and plants have also been identified within the refuge. Open seasonally, the visitor center includes an exhibit hall of mounted North Dakota animals in prairie, wetland, forest, and agriculture habitats, education classrooms, and a book store. The center offer programs for school groups, public workshops, guided nature hikes, bird-watching walks, summer youth programs, and conservation programs throughout the year.

References

External links
U.S. Fish & Wildlife Service: White Horse Hill National Game Preserve

Grasslands of North Dakota
National Wildlife Refuges in North Dakota
Protected areas of Benson County, North Dakota
Protected areas established in 1904
1904 establishments in North Dakota
Nature centers in North Dakota
Wetlands of North Dakota
Landforms of Benson County, North Dakota
Former national parks of the United States